The 2015 Chinese Taipei Masters Grand Prix was the fourteenth grand prix badminton tournament of the 2015 BWF Grand Prix and Grand Prix Gold. The tournament was held in Hsing Chuang Gymnasium, Taipei, Chinese Taipei October 13–18, 2015 and had a total purse of $50,000.

Men's singles

Seeds

  Nguyễn Tiến Minh (second round)
  Zulfadli Zulkiffli (third round)
  Jonatan Christie (third round)
  Jeon Hyeok-jin (second round)
  Wang Tzu-wei (final)
  Derek Wong Zi Liang (third round)
  Ihsan Maulana Mustofa (semifinals)
  Riichi Takeshita (first round)
  Anthony Sinisuka Ginting (quarterfinals)
  Firman Abdul Kholik (second round)
  Suppanyu Avihingsanon (second round)
  Lin Yu-hsien (quarterfinals)
  Sameer Verma (second round)
  Tan Chun Seang (first round)
  Liew Daren (third round)
  Sony Dwi Kuncoro (champion)

Finals

Top half

Section 1

Section 2

Section 3

Section 4

Bottom half

Section 5

Section 6

Section 7

Section 8

Women's singles

Seeds

  Kim Hyo-min (final)
  Chen Jiayuan (semifinals)
  Hanna Ramadini (withdrawn)
  Cheng Chi-ya (quarterfinals)
  Vũ Thị Trang (semifinals)
  Bellaetrix Manuputty (second round)
  Kana Ito (first round)
  Gregoria Mariska Tunjung (first round)

Finals

Top half

Section 1

Section 2

Bottom half

Section 3

Section 4

Men's doubles

Seeds

Finals

Top half

Section 1

Section 2

Bottom half

Section 3

Section 4

Women's doubles

Seeds

Finals

Top half

Section 1

Section 2

Bottom half

Section 3

Section 4

Mixed doubles

Seeds

Finals

Top half

Section 1

Section 2

Bottom half

Section 3

Section 4

References

Chinese Taipei Masters
BWF Grand Prix Gold and Grand Prix
Chinese Taipei Masters Grand Prix
2015 in Taiwanese sport